Charles Edward Adams (October 1, 1867 – October 6, 1936) was an American lawyer and Republican politician who was a member of the Minnesota Senate and Minnesota's 25th Lieutenant Governor.

Life and career
Adams was born in Boston, Massachusetts in 1867. His family moved to New York in 1882, then later to the Dakota Territory. Adams attended high school and his first year of college in Fargo, North Dakota before transferring to Princeton University in 1892. After a year he transferred to the University of Minnesota where he completed his degree, graduating in 1896. While there Adams played on the Minnesota Golden Gophers football team from 1893 to 1895 as quarterback and halfback. He later earned a law degree from the University of Minnesota Law School in 1900.

Career 
After a brief period as superintendent of the Granite Falls, Minnesota schools.

Adams settled in Duluth, Minnesota and started a law practice. In 1911, he was named special counsel for St. Louis County, Minnesota. In 1914 he was elected to his first term in the Minnesota Senate, a position he would hold for the next 22 years. While a senator he was an advocate for the Babcock Amendment which established the Minnesota trunk highways as well as causes related to transportation, taxation and education. He became president pro tempore of the Minnesota Senate in 1929 which meant that he became acting lieutenant governor after William Ignatius Nolan was elected to the U.S. House of Representatives.

Personal life 
In 1902, he married Grace Mabel Tennant. Adams died while in office on October 6, 1936. He is buried in Lakewood Cemetery in Minneapolis, Minnesota.

References

1867 births
1936 deaths
Republican Party Minnesota state senators
University of Minnesota Law School alumni
Minnesota Golden Gophers football players
Burials at Lakewood Cemetery
People from Duluth, Minnesota